Abkhazian women, particularly those of older age, are traditionally portrayed as peacemakers, decision makers, and mediators in times of combat and conflict.  The women in Abkhazia only have a marginal in number within the showground of Abkhazian politics.  At present, the Abkhazian females are more active as participants in the realm of business and in activities related to establishing organizations for women in their country.

Gallery

See also
Saida Gunba

References

External links

Association of Women of Abkhazia (AZhA), Partners in Abkhazia, c-r.org

History of Abkhazia
Abkhazian people
Abkhazia